Baumwollspinnereien is both the term in German for a cotton mill, and used as a prefix in the name of a cotton spinning company. A location where cotton was processed into cloth was also called a Textilverarbeitungsanlagen.

Germany 
 :de:Mechanische Baumwollspinnerei und Weberei Augsburg, Bayern
 :de:Baumwollspinnerei Max Ebenauer & Co., Bayern
 :de:Baumwollspinnerei Kolbermoor, Bayern
 Grevener Baumwollspinnerei, Nordrhein-Westfalen
 Baumwollspinnerei Ermen & Engels, Engelskirchen, Nordrhein-Westfalen
 :de:Crefelder Baumwoll-Spinnerei, Krefeld, Nordrhein-Westfalen
 Baumwollspinnerei Hammerstein, Wuppertal, Nordrhein-Westfalen
 Textilfabrik Cromford
 :de:VEB Vereinigte Baumwollspinnereien und Zwirnereien Flöha, Sachsen
 Leipziger Baumwollspinnerei, Sachsen (de), Sachsen
 Alte Baumwollspinnerei St. Ingbert(de), Saarland
 :de:Baumwollspinnerei Leinefelde, Thüringen
 (see also: :de:Liste von Baumwollspinnereien im deutschsprachigen Raum and :de:Kategorie:Baumwollspinnerei)

Austria 
 :de:Harlander Coats, St. Pölten, Niederösterreich
 Baumwollspinnerei Teesdorf, Niederösterreich
 Pottendorfer Baumwollspinnerei Niederösterreich

Switzerland 
 :de:General-Societät der englischen Baumwollspinnerei in St. Gallen
 :de:Spinnerei Hard, Winterthur

Germany
Textile industry of Germany
Mills